"Book of Love" (also titled "(Who Wrote) The Book of Love") is a rock and roll / doo-wop song, originally by The Monotones. It was written by three members of the group, Warren Davis, George Malone and Charles Patrick.

Lead singer Charles Patrick heard a Pepsodent toothpaste commercial with the line "you'll wonder where the yellow went"/ "when you brush your teeth with Pepsodent", which inspired him to come up with, "I wonder, wonder, wonder who, who wrote the book of love". He worked it up into a song with Davis and Malone. The "boom" part of the song was a result of a kid kicking a ball against the garage while they were rehearsing. It sounded good, so they added it to the song.

In September 1957, the Monotones recorded "The Book of Love"; it was released on the Mascot label in December that year. The small record company could not cope with its popularity, and it was reissued on Chess Records' subsidiary Argo label in February 1958. On the Billboard charts, "The Book of Love" peaked at No. 5 on the pop chart and No. 3 on the R&B chart. Outside the US, the song reached No. 5 in Australia.

Cover versions
In the UK, The Mudlarks did a successful rendition.
In France, Tiny Yong released a cover version with French lyrics by Bernard Michel as the lead track of her 1964 EP "Histoire d'amour".
In 1985, on The 4 Seasons album, Streetfighter.
In 1990, Ben E. King and Bo Diddley featuring Doug Lazy recorded a revamped rap version of "Book of Love" for the soundtrack of the film, Book of Love.

In popular culture
Rock and roll revival group Sha Na Na performed "The Book of Love" at Woodstock in 1969.
The song is referenced in Don McLean's "American Pie" and in the lyrics of Led Zeppelin's "Rock and Roll".
It was featured as a theme to the game show The Newlywed Game hosted by Paul Rodriguez after he replaced Bob Eubanks (1988–1989).
In the Who's The Boss? episode "Tony and the Dreamtones," Tony and his singing group the Dreamtones rehearse and sing this song for a charity event. Angela sang this song to Tony as well and wanted to sing with them at the charity even.
"The Book of Love" appeared in multiple films, including American Graffiti (1973), Christine (1983), Stand by Me (1986), Le Nouveau monde (1995) and in the video game Mafia II (2010).
The '80s/'90s synthpop band Book of Love named themselves after the song for its imagery and romantic connotations.

See also
 List of 1950s one-hit wonders in the United States

References

1958 singles
The Monotones songs
1957 songs
Argo Records singles